Déjà Vu is a song by Australian indie rock group, Something for Kate. It was issued in July 2003 as the lead single ahead of their fourth studio album, The Official Fiction (August 2003), and peaked at No. 19 on the ARIA Singles Charts. It became part of the band's live set.

Music video

A music video directed by Grant Marshall was produced to promote the single.

Track listings

Australian CD
 "Déjà Vu" (Radio Edit)
 "Losing My Mind"
 "Blueprint Architecture"
 "You Only Hide" (Live Acoustic)

Charts

References

External links
https://web.archive.org/web/20090629194352/http://www.somethingforkate.com/release/items/deja-vu.html

2003 singles
Something for Kate songs
2003 songs